Todd Andrew Krygier (born October 12, 1965) is an American former professional ice hockey player. He played in the National Hockey League (NHL) for the Hartford Whalers, Washington Capitals, and Mighty Ducks of Anaheim between 1989 and 1997. Internationally Krygier played for the American national team at three World Championships. After finishing his playing career Krygier turned to coaching, and since 2019 has been an assistant coach for the Grand Rapids Griffins of the American Hockey League

Playing career
After playing for the University of Connecticut, Krygier was selected by the Hartford Whalers in the 1988 NHL Supplemental Draft. He played parts of two seasons with the Whalers before being traded to the Washington Capitals in 1991. In 1994, he was traded to the Mighty Ducks of Anaheim.

Krygier played a season and a half in Anaheim before he was re-acquired by the Capitals during the 1995–96 NHL season. It was during his second tour with the Capitals that he would make the most of his opportunity as his gritty style of play would help guide the Capitals to their first ever appearance in the Stanley Cup Finals in 1998. Krygier played two seasons with the Orlando Solar Bears of the International Hockey League before retiring from active play.

Perhaps Krygier's most memorable goal came in the 1998 Eastern Conference Finals as a member of the Capitals versus the visiting Buffalo Sabres. In overtime of game two, Krygier one-timed a pass from teammate Andrei Nikolishin past Sabres goaltender Dominik Hasek to win the game and tie the series at one game apiece. The goal was controversial because of the possibility that the Capitals had iced the puck and a Sabre had touched it behind the goal line, but play was not whistled down. The Capitals went on to win the series in six games before being swept by the Detroit Red Wings in the Stanley Cup Finals.

Krygier was previously the head coach of the Compuware AAA mite hockey team, as well as the head hockey coach at Novi High School where he won the school's first and only State Title in 2011. In June 2013, Krygier was announced as the new coach of the Muskegon Lumberjacks United States Hockey League team until he was released in July 2016. He is now an assistant coach with the Western Michigan Broncos men's ice hockey team.

In 543 NHL games, Krygier scored 100 goals and 143 assists.

Personal life
Krygier has five children, all of whom are athletes: daughters Natalie, who played soccer at the University of Iowa and Grace, who currently plays soccer at the University of Wisconsin–Madison, and sons Brock, who played hockey at Michigan State and Arizona State, and twins Christian and Cole, who both play at Michigan State. Christian and Cole were both selected five picks apart in the 2018 NHL Entry Draft by the New York Islanders and Florida Panthers respectively.

Career statistics

Regular season and playoffs

International

References

External links

1965 births
American ice hockey coaches
American men's ice hockey left wingers
Binghamton Whalers players
UConn Huskies men's ice hockey players
Hartford Whalers draft picks
Hartford Whalers players
Ice hockey players from Illinois
Living people
Mighty Ducks of Anaheim players
National Hockey League supplemental draft picks
New Haven Nighthawks players
Orlando Solar Bears (IHL) players
People from Chicago Heights, Illinois
Portland Pirates players
Sportspeople from the Chicago metropolitan area
Washington Capitals players